Moj dilbere (English: My Sweetheart or My Darling) is a Bosnian traditional folk and sevdalinka song.

The song is sung from the female point of view, no matter the gender of the singer.

Origins
The song has been in Bosnia since Ottoman times. The exact authors are unknown and Moj dilbere is considered to be a traditional song.

Lyrics
The song is sung from the perspective of a female in the Ottoman Empire.

Covers
Moj dilbere has been covered frequently over the years. Covers have been done by singers from Bosnia, Macedonia, Montenegro, Serbia and various other countries.

| width="50%" align="left" valign="top" style="border:0"|
Alma Subašić
Amira Medunjanin
Bele Višnje
Divlje jagode
Donna Ares
Elvira Rahić
Esma Redžepova
Hanka Paldum
Haris Džinović
Indira Radić
Ksenija Cicvaric
Lepa Brena
Merima Njegomir
Mostar Sevdah Reunion
| width="50%" align="left" valign="top" style="border:0"|
Nada Mamula
Neda Ukraden
Nervozni poštar
Safet Isović
Saša Matić
Sead Lipovača
Silvana Armenulić
Sofka Nikolić
Toše Proeski
Vesna Zmijanac
Zehra Deović
Željko Joksimović

See also
List of Bosnia and Herzegovina folk songs
Sevdalinka
Emina
Kraj potoka bistre vode
Sejdefu majka buđaše

References

Sevdalinka
Bosnia and Herzegovina songs
Bosnia and Herzegovina music
Bosniak culture
Bosnia and Herzegovina folk music